Cymbeline (also known as Anarchy) is a 2014 American film version of the play Cymbeline by William Shakespeare. The film is directed by Michael Almereyda and stars Ethan Hawke, Ed Harris, Dakota Johnson, Milla Jovovich and John Leguizamo.

Synopsis
Based on the play Cymbeline by William Shakespeare, the story revolves around a war between dirty cops and a biker gang. The king of the bikers has lost his sons and needs his daughter to marry royalty to maintain the bloodline. The new Queen wishes to kill the king and her step-daughter in order to install her own son as the new gang leader. The step-daughter has married a penniless gang member, who is banished from the gang territory by the King. The banished son-in-law is tricked into believing that his wife is unfaithful through a photograph taken while she was sleeping. These many intertwined players will travel through desperate straits before all is resolved.

Cast
Ethan Hawke as Iachimo, who bets that he can seduce Posthumus' chaste Imogen
Ed Harris as Cymbeline, King of the Briton Motorcycle Club
Milla Jovovich as Queen, second wife of the King, who wants to cement her power by having Cloten marry Imogen
John Leguizamo as Pisanio, Cymbeline's right hand man, tricked by the Queen into delivering (imagined) poison to Imogen
Penn Badgley as Posthumus, penniless amour, then secret husband, of Imogen. Plans to kill her after he is deceived by Iachimo.
Dakota Johnson as Imogen, daughter of Cymbeline, calls herself Fidel while later traveling disguised as a boy when searching for her banished love
Anton Yelchin as Cloten, son of the Queen
Peter Gerety as Dr. Cornelius, who undermines the Queen’s plans to kill Cymbeline and Imogen by giving her sleeping pills instead of poison.
Kevin Corrigan as The Hangman
Vondie Curtis-Hall as Caius Lucius, Chief of the Rome Police Department 
James Ransone as Philario, who befriends the banished Posthumus
Bill Pullman as Sicilius Leonatus, Posthumus' father
Delroy Lindo as Belarius, who kidnapped and lovingly raised Cymbeline‘s two sons, Guiderius and Arvirargus, as his own
Spencer Treat Clark as Guiderius, a (unaware) prince

Production
On July 31, 2013, it was announced that Ethan Hawke was re-teaming with director Michael Almereyda to star in the adaptation of Cymbeline. He would play Iachimo and production was set to start on August 19 in New York City. Anthony Katagas and Michael Benaroya would be the producers of the film. On August 5, it was announced that Ed Harris had signed to star opposite Hawke. He would play the role of King Cymbeline. Penn Badgley joined the cast in the adaptation of Cymbeline to play the role of orphan Posthumus who secretly marries the daughter of King Cymbeline and is banished by the monarch who raised Posthumus as a son.

On August 8, 2013, Milla Jovovich also joined the cast as a female lead; she would play the role of Queen who schemes to move her own son from a previous marriage onto the throne at the expense of the orphan Posthumus and the King’s daughter. Additional cast members added on 12 August included Anton Yelchin and Dakota Johnson, Yelchin would play Cloten, the son of the Queen by a former husband and Johnson would be playing the role of Imogen, the daughter of King Cymbeline from a previous marriage.

Release
Prior to the world premiere of the film, it was announced Lionsgate had acquired all distribution rights to the film. The film had its world premiere at the Venice Film Festival in Italy on September 3, 2014. The film then went to screen at the Busan International Film Festival in South Korea on October 3, 2014. For a short time, the film's U.S. title was Anarchy, but it was changed back to Cymbeline, though in some markets it is known as Anarchy: Ride or Die to avoid confusion with Sons of Anarchy. The film was released in a limited release and through video on demand on March 13, 2015.

Reception
On review aggregating website Rotten Tomatoes, the film has a score of 31%, based on 29 reviews, with an average rating of 4.6/10. On Metacritic, which uses a weighted score, the film has a rating of 54 out of 100 based on 15 reviews, indicating "mixed or average reviews".

References

External links

2014 films
2014 independent films
2010s crime films
2010s thriller films
American crime films
American thriller films
American drama films
American police detective films
Films about drugs
Films based on works by William Shakespeare
Outlaw biker films
American films about revenge
Lionsgate films
Modern adaptations of works by William Shakespeare
American films based on plays
Fictional portrayals of the New York City Police Department
Films about the New York City Police Department
Films set in New York City
Films shot in New York City
Films directed by Michael Almereyda
2014 drama films
2010s English-language films
2010s American films